The black-throated tody-tyrant (Hemitriccus granadensis) is a species of bird in the family Tyrannidae.

It is found in Bolivia, Colombia, Ecuador, Peru, and Venezuela. Its natural habitat is subtropical or tropical moist montane forests.

References

black-throated tody-tyrant
Birds of the Northern Andes
black-throated tody-tyrant
Taxonomy articles created by Polbot